Abdulaziz Al-Saran (born 25 January 1984) is a retired Saudi Arabian footballer who played as a forward.

Career
Al-Saran began his career at the youth team of Ushaiger before joining Al-Hilal. He then left the club and joined Al-Shabab. On 21 January 2012, he left Al-Shabab and joined Al-Nassr. On 16 August 2013, Al-Saran left Al-Nassr and joined Al-Faisaly. On 26 January 2015, he was released by Al-Faisaly and subsequently joined Al-Nahda.

Honours

Club
Al-Shabab
 Saudi Professional League: 2003–04, 2005–06, 2011–12
King Cup: 2008, 2009
Saudi Federation Cup: 2008–09, 2009–10

References

External links
 
 

1984 births
Living people
Sportspeople from Riyadh
Saudi Arabian footballers
Saudi Arabia international footballers
Saudi Arabia youth international footballers
Association football forwards
Ushaiger Club players
Al Hilal SFC players
Al-Shabab FC (Riyadh) players
Al Nassr FC players
Al-Faisaly FC players
Al-Nahda Club (Saudi Arabia) players
Saudi Professional League players
Saudi First Division League players